Deinandra minthornii — (syn. Hemizonia minthornii)  — is a rare California species of flowering plant in the family Asteraceae known by the common name Santa Susana tarplant, or Santa Susana tarweed. It is listed as a rare species by the California Department of Fish and Wildlife and on the California Native Plant Society Inventory of Rare and Endangered Plants of California.

Distribution
Deinandra minthornii is endemic from the Santa Susana Mountains, through the Simi Hills, to the Santa Monica Mountains of the southwestern Transverse Ranges, in Los Angeles and Ventura Counties, Southern California.

This plant grows in the coastal sage scrub and chaparral habitats of the coastal sage and chaparral, and the chaparral habitat of the adjacent inland the montane chaparral and woodlands. There are about 20 occurrences of the plant, but several have not been observed recently.

Description
The stems are hairy, glandular, and leafy. The thick leaves are linear, smooth-edged or with a few teeth. They are glandular and hairy to bristly.

The phyllaries lining the flower heads are coated in glands. The head contains four to eight yellow ray florets and several yellow disc florets.

References

External links

 Calflora Database: Deinandra minthornii (Santa Susana tarplant)
 Jepson Manual  eFlora (TJM2) treatment: Hemizonia minthornii
USDA Plants Profile for Deinandra minthornii (Santa Susana tarweed)

minthornii
Endemic flora of California
Natural history of the California chaparral and woodlands
Natural history of the Santa Monica Mountains
Natural history of Los Angeles County, California
Natural history of Ventura County, California
Natural history of the Transverse Ranges
Santa Susana Mountains
Simi Hills
Plants described in 1925
Taxa named by Willis Linn Jepson
Critically endangered flora of California